Frederick Joseph Gilman is an American physicist, currently the Buhl Professor at Carnegie Mellon University and formerly the Dean.

Biography 

Gilman received his BS from Michigan State University and his PhD from Princeton University under the supervision of Marvin Leonard Goldberger, and held a postdoctoral position at Caltech. He was a professor at SLAC, deputy director of the Superconducting Super Collider, and Dean of the Mellon College of Science at Carnegie Mellon University.

In 1985, Gilman was elected a Fellow of the American Physical Society "for highly original and timely contributions to the phenomenolgy of elementary particle reactions, especially for his creative interplay with the experimental program at SLAC, including the elucidation of scaling behavior in deeply inelastic scattering".

References

Year of birth missing (living people)
Living people
Carnegie Mellon University faculty
21st-century American physicists
Fellows of the American Physical Society